This article lists characters seen in the film The Nightmare Before Christmas and two video games: The Nightmare Before Christmas: The Pumpkin King and The Nightmare Before Christmas: Oogie's Revenge.

Design
The filmmakers constructed 230 puppets to represent the characters in the movie, with Jack Skellington having "around eight hundred heads", allowing the expression of every possible emotion. Sally's mouth movements "were animated through the replacement method. During the animation process, only Sally's face 'mask' was removed to preserve the order of her long red hair. Sally had ten types of faces, each made with a series of eleven expressions and synchronised mouth movements."

Main

Jack Skellington

The film's protagonist, Jack Skellington is a skeleton who holds the title of The Pumpkin King. He is popular among the residents of Halloween Town, due to his charming personality and aim to please. Despite a lack of inhibition, he means well. He is in charge of Halloween. Having repeated the same routine for years, he feels his inspiration for his own holiday waning. Christmas Town gives him new ideas and inspiration. He also appears in The Nightmare Before Christmas: Oogie's Revenge.

He is voiced in all canon appearances by Chris Sarandon, and his singing voice in the film was provided by Danny Elfman. Since the film was originally released as an adults product, as it was thought to be "too dark and scary for kids", in non-English speaking countries, Disney Character Voices International only dubbed the film in a few languages in which adults movies, as well as kids movies, are usually dubbed, while in the rest of countries it was only released with subtitles. A few versions dubbed only the spoken lines, leaving the songs in English.

Jack Skellington made cameos in the film James and the Giant Peach as the "pirate captain". Jack Skellington appears in the Robot Chicken episode "Anne Marie's Pride", voiced by Victor Yerrid.

Sally

Sally is Jack Skellington's love interest. She is a very pretty, loving, caring, and shy rag doll who told Jack that Christmas and Halloween shouldn't be mixed. She is originally patched together by Doctor Finkelstein. Sally is the only one to have doubts about Jack's Christmas plan. Although her creator attempts to keep her constantly imprisoned, she often manages to escape by slipping him deadly nightshade, causing him to fall asleep so she can escape. Despite her makeshift appearance, Sally is a determined individual with a good feel for what is right. Fiona Apple provides the vocals for "Sally's Song" on the 2006 special edition of The Nightmare Before Christmas: Original Motion Picture Soundtrack, while Amy Lee provides the vocals for "Sally's Song" on Nightmare Revisited. She also appears in Tim Burton's The Nightmare Before Christmas: Oogie's Revenge.

Sally is a rag doll-type character, with detachable limbs stuffed with fall leaves. She often falls apart, requiring her to sew herself back together, and carries a set of sewing needles and thread for that purpose. She was created by Doctor Finkelstein, Halloween Town's resident mad scientist, as a companion. Their relationship is rather tense, as Finkelstein insists on keeping Sally under lock and key, under the pretext of protecting her from the dangers of the outside world. However Sally is restless and curious.

It is this restlessness, or, more specifically, this desire for something better in her life, that draws her to Jack Skellington. In the beginning of the movie, she idolizes and admires Jack much like any of the other residents of Halloween Town; however, she quickly discovers that they are connected by the desire for something more in their lives, and her feelings for him intensify. The two refer to each other as "friends", though Jack seems unaware of Sally's true feelings for him, as she is too shy to make them known to him other than through her sweet actions until the end of the film.

On the album to the film it is mentioned that years later Sandy Claws returned to Halloween Town and saw that Jack now had four or five skeleton children of his own. Many fans of the film and of the franchise assume that given the ending to the film, that Jack and Sally eventually got married and had a family of their own.

Bryan Theiss declares that "Sally is one of those rare fantasy characters we can relate to on a certain level as much as we can to real-world characters on a more literal level."

Sally's voice was played by Catherine O'Hara throughout the movie, and Kath Soucie in the video game spin-offs.

Oogie Boogie

Oogie Boogie (voiced by Ken Page in all of his appearances) is the main antagonist that resembles a large burlap sack; when Oogie Boogie is defeated, it is revealed that he is filled with many bugs.

Oogie Boogie did not appear in Tim Burton's original poem, but Burton later sketched a portrait of what appeared to be a potato sack man with horrible things inside. The Oogie puppet was two feet high, twice the height of the other puppets. Ken Page claims that he based his performance as Oogie as "somewhere between Bert Lahr in The Wizard of Oz and the voice of the demon in The Exorcist ". In his autobiography Burton on Burton, Burton says that Oogie Boogie was loosely inspired by Cab Calloway's appearances in several Betty Boop cartoons and that he asked Danny Elfman to make Oogie's song in Nightmare slightly resemble Calloway's 1931 recording of the song "Minnie the Moocher". Elfman ended up referencing the Betty Boop cartoon The Old Man of the Mountain (1933), also featuring Calloway; Santa's line "Well, what are you going to do?" and Oogie Boogie's response of "I'm gonna do the best I can!" are direct quotes from this cartoon. Another idea for Oogie's identity was for him to be Dr. Finkelstein in disguise, gaining revenge on Jack and Sally, but it was not pursued past storyboards since Tim Burton scrapped the idea. This is visible on the Special Edition DVD.

Despite the fact that Oogie is separated for the most part from the other inhabitants of Halloween Town, it appears they still allow him to take part in their celebration, as his shadow makes an appearance on the moon in the opening musical "This Is Halloween". He lives in an underground lair full of torture devices, each of which features a casino-like appearance, suggesting an addiction to gambling (this is enforced by his use of dice). Red skeletons are in several of the devices, and overhanging chains are used as perches by skeletal bats. Oogie Boogie's lair, during his theme song, is lit with black lights in the style of a cheap funhouse. Under these, Oogie himself glows bright green, similar to a glow stick. After the lights dim, however, the bright color is sapped from his lair, transforming its appearance into that of a dank, cellar-like dungeon. Above his lair is the clubhouse of Lock, Shock, and Barrel, who feed him bugs regularly via a metal chute. It is at first believed that Oogie cannot be killed or die but it is later revealed he can if his brain, the lead bug, is destroyed. In the movie, Lock, Shock and Barrel kidnap Santa Claus and send him down to Oogie Boogie's lair, where he is bound to a giant roulette wheel. Sally, after finding out Santa's fate, attempts to rescue him but is captured herself. Oogie then tortures and tries to kill Sally and Santa Claus, but is foiled by Jack, who eventually pulls a thread loose from him, which rips off the sack covering him and causes the majority of his bugs to fall into the lava pit. The lead bug is then squashed by Santa after it falls next to the pit. The rest of the bugs scurry off after this.

In The Nightmare Before Christmas: The Pumpkin King, Oogie's origins and the birth of his rivalry with Jack were revealed. As it turns out, he once had his own holiday named Bug Day that was forgotten by the people of the real world and thus vanished. Oogie escaped, found Halloween Town, and decided that it would be the new Bug Day. He and his army of insects invaded the town and nearly took it over. Jack found out and he defeated the bugs and Oogie. Oogie survived the battle, learned to fear the Pumpkin King, and was imprisoned within his underground lair of which Jack warns that if Oogie ever leave his lair, it would be "game over!" for him (Oogie). Oogie complied, but secretly vowed revenge.

In the 2004 video game The Nightmare Before Christmas: Oogie's Revenge, Oogie is resurrected by his henchmen Lock, Shock, and Barrel, who sew him back together. He quickly deceives the residents of Halloween Town and tricks the townspeople into making traps for Jack, stating that Jack wouldn't return if they don't make an even scarier Halloween for next year. Oogie then attempts to become the Seven Holidays King, successfully kidnaps the real leaders, and tries to murder Santa Claus again. His plans are foiled by Jack. Desperate, Oogie puts up a fight in the Holiday Trash Hill by turning into a gigantic junk-filled version of himself named "Mega-Oogie." He is again destroyed when his bugs come out of him.

Oogie also appears with other Disney Villains at Halloween events such as the Haunted Mansion Holiday at Disneyland and Tokyo Disneyland, the HalloWishes and Halloween Screams fireworks shows at the Magic Kingdom and Disneyland, respectively, World of Color: Villainous at Disney California Adventure, and during the "Mickey's Not-So-Scary Halloween Party",  "Mickey's Halloween Party", and "Oogie Boogie Bash" separate-admission ("hard ticket") events.

Oogie Boogie also appears in the video game Kingdom Hearts as a member of Maleficent's team of Disney villains. He appears again in the sequel Kingdom Hearts II where he attempts to turn Santa Claus into a Heartless, and in Kingdom Hearts: Chain of Memories as an enemy based on Sora's memories of him.

Doctor Finkelstein

Doctor Finkelstein is a resident of Halloween Town. He is the mad scientist and the "father" of Sally. He is described as a pale-as-a-sheet mad scientist with a duckbill-like mouth and a hinged skullcap that he can open up to reveal his brain. For unknown reasons, he uses a motorized wheelchair. Finkelstein is only referred to as the "Evil Scientist" in the credits. His true name is only mentioned in the movie when the Mayor calls him up to the front of the line for his Christmas assignment.

Doctor Finkelstein lives in a large observatory with his living rag doll creation Sally and his hunchbacked assistant Igor. James Whale's Frankenstein is quoted in Finkelstein's line "I made you with my own hands". Unlike Dr. Frankenstein, Finkelstein takes full responsibility over Sally and acts as an over-protective father by keeping her under lock and key under the pretext of sheltering her from the world's hidden dangers. Although he is very strict towards Sally, he is also shown to be kind and helpful towards Jack as he allowed Jack to borrow some of his equipment so he can conduct his experiments with his recently obtained Christmas objects. Finkelstein also has a hand in helping Jack Skellington with his plan to take over Christmas by bringing to life several skeletal reindeer to pull Jack's sleigh. At the end of the film, Finkelstein, deciding that Sally might be ready to take on the world's dangers after all, lets her go free and creates a wife for himself using a portion of his own brain to move on with his own life.

Dr. Finkelstein is featured in The Nightmare Before Christmas: Oogie's Revenge. When Jack is still tired of doing the same thing at Halloween, Dr. Finkelstein helps him by giving him the Soul Robber, a weapon that allows Jack to change its shape. Jack also tells Dr. Finkelstein to watch over the town while he is away. After Oogie Boogie's revival, Dr. Finkelstein was under Oogie's control by switching his brain to a different one and created monsters that obey Oogie Boogie's every command. When Jack confronted Dr. Finkelstein and found that his brain has been switched, he started a plan to get rid of it by using the "sleeping soup" that Sally gave him. Jack was able to put Dr. Finkelstein's original brain back in place making Dr. Finkelstein break from Oogie's control. In the game spin-offs, Finkelstein's name is pronounced "steen" instead of "stein". For some reason, his wife creation "Jewel" is not present in the game, and Sally appears to still be living with him even though in the movie she appeared to be free at the end. Sally even says "He insists on keeping me locked up" while next to the Hanging Tree in the Graveyard.

Finkelstein also appears in Kingdom Hearts and other games in the series. When the Heartless appear in Halloween Town, Jack thinks of adding them to the Halloween celebrations and asks Dr. Finkelstein for advice. Realizing that the Heartless need a heart, the two find the ingredients for one: pulse and emotion. Their initial experiment fails, and Dr. Finkelstein sends Jack off with Sora and the gang to retrieve two more ingredients, memory and surprise, thus completing the heart. However, the heart is stolen by Oogie Boogie. In Kingdom Hearts: Chain of Memories, created from Sora's memories, Dr. Finkelstein creates a potion that allows people to see their true memory. The only problem is that once he sniffed the potion, Heartless appeared. In Kingdom Hearts II Finkelstein creates an experiment aided by Lock, Shock, and Barrel. As the Experiment has no heart, it goes on a rampage to steal gifts, in an attempt to understand the emotions behind giving and gain a heart of its own. Sadly, Sora and the gang have no choice but to destroy the Experiment.

Dr. Finkelstein was voiced by William Hickey in the film and by Jess Harnell in the video game spin-offs. His Japanese voice is provided by Yūji Mitsuya.

Mayor of Halloween Town

The Mayor of Halloween Town is depicted as a short, fat man, who has the appearance of a giant candy corn with a cone-shaped double-sided head, wearing an impossibly tall hat, a spider tie, and a ribbon of office that says "Mayor" on it. His double-sided head has two faces: One face is peach-skinned, rosy-cheeked, and smiling while the other face is white-skinned, pale and frowning with pointed teeth. Depending on the Mayor's mood, his head swivels around to display the right face with a loud clicking sound. When not in use, the other face has its eyes closed and is considered dormant.

Despite his office, the Mayor apparently has very little actual authority in the day-to-day running of the town, nor much confidence in his leadership skills, especially in planning for Halloween; trying to bother Jack in November 1st (the day after Halloween) for his input. Nonetheless, the Mayor seems to enjoy his position. He apparently owns one of the few automobiles in town, a hearse-like car called the "Mayor-mobile" that is equipped with a loudspeaker for making announcements. The Mayor supports Jack and helps him in his quest to bring his own version of Christmas to the world, despite his secret misgivings about it.

The Mayor of Halloween Town appears in Kingdom Hearts and Kingdom Hearts II. His role in both games is fairly minor. In the first game, he helps Jack and Sora find an ingredient they need for the heart Dr. Finkelstein is making. In the second game, he tries to stop two Heartless outbreaks by yelling at the Heartless through his megaphone, but has no success.

In The Nightmare Before Christmas: Oogie's Revenge, the Mayor is seen in the opening cut scene congratulating Jack on another "horrible" Halloween. He is later seen in the level "Mayor's Madhouse" where Jack rescues him from a cage hanging from the roof of his house. While Jack goes to Christmas Town, the Mayor frees the other holiday leaders.

He is voiced by Glenn Shadix in the film, Oogie's Revenge, and Kingdom Hearts II. and by Jeff Bennett in Kingdom Hearts.

Lock, Shock and Barrel

Lock, Shock, and Barrel are introduced as Oogie Boogie's "little henchmen", being 6, 7 and 5 years old, respectively. The trio seem to not be very loyal to Oogie Boogie, although they take pride in the work they do and want to please him as they are simply making mischief both for their own fun and to stay on his good side. After his death, the trio help the Mayor bring Jack and Sally out of Oogie Boogie's lair and have harmless fun when it begins to snow in Halloweentown. Presumably due to their lust for trouble (or simply to provide conflict for Jack, storywise) they have shown no protest and even happiness when their master was revived in the spinoffs, and once reanimated him themselves in "Oogie's Revenge". They are all trick-or-treaters, with masks similar to their faces. Their names are a play on the phrase, "lock, stock, and barrel." Though not totally antagonistic, they are usually comedic relief. They appear to be anti-heroes or merely chaotic neutral characters, as they will work for most of those who summon them regardless of moral alignment, and due to their young age seem to be motivated by boredom instead of actual malicious intent.

 Lock is the leader of Oogie's Boys, but does not always think through things thoroughly and just likes to be in charge. Lock wears a red devil costume; his tail is a real devil's tail, his teeth are pointed sharply. His face is narrow and long-jawed with angular features, and his red and brown hair is formed into two horns making him, literally, a handsome devil. He likes to think highly of himself and gets upset when others insult him or take the lead; however, he goes along with others' ideas if he fails to come up with anything himself.
 Shock is the only female of Oogie's henchmen. She is the oldest, and the most cunning and intelligent of the three. She has some contempt for the other two for their supposed stupidity, although she gets tired with them, she is quick to patch up any arguments between her and her cohorts, if not with the nicest methods. Shock wears a purple witch costume with an elongated hat and she sometimes carries a broomstick. She has a high-pitched girl's voice, pale-green skin, a long pointed nose, and violet-blue wirey hair. She tends to be rather impatient, disliking unplanned steps, like where exactly to take Santa Claws, or ambiguity when they cannot hear down Oogie Boogie's lair in a deleted scene. She often takes the lead in many plans and likes to be right. 
 Barrel - is Oogie's "star pupil", presumably the youngest, and considered the stupidest of the three troublemakers, despite his protests to the contrary. He is the butt of many jokes made by his friends, but usually gets even through his own tricks which he always gets away with. Barrel wears a skeleton costume and has deformed feet and almost always carries an orange and black lolipop, otherwise resembling a small human boy, albeit one with white skin, sunken eyes, and perfectly coiffed green hair. His face is round and has a perpetual grin, except when he is angry or scared. Barrel usually pilots the walking bathtub the trio use as transport. Often he gets left out of things because he is forever falling over his own deformed feet and he is sometimes slow to catch on. Despite this, he is quite innovative, suggesting several ways to execute the capture of Santa Claus. While none of them work, he still attempts to be the smart person of the group and often fails, he is a foil for Shock. The two often fight over who is smarter before being stopped by Lock.

Jack sends Lock, Shock, and Barrel to kidnap Santa Claus. At first, they accidentally capture the Easter Bunny, whereupon Jack tells them to apologize and sends them back. They then capture their true quarry, and Jack takes Santa's hat. The trio then take Santa Claus to Oogie's lair, where Oogie taunts and threatens Santa. Once Jack has defeated Oogie and rescued Santa Claus, a hatch above opens and Lock, Shock, and Barrel appear now protagonists, having led the Mayor to Oogie's lair to find them. They are last seen throwing a snowball at Jack's face.

In The Nightmare Before Christmas: The Pumpkin King, Oogie Boogie sends Lock, Shock, and Barrel out to nab the new "Pumpkin King." They come back with Sally instead, saying she looked like Jack in the dark. Throughout the game, they are behind most of the ruckus going on around town ranging from poisoning the acid pools, driving the leeches crazy, knocking down the town's lamps, luring Jack into death traps, and helping Oogie in the final battle.

In The Nightmare Before Christmas: Oogie's Revenge, Lock, Shock, and Barrel decide to revive Oogie Boogie out of boredom when they learn that Jack is temporarily leaving Halloween Town. In the game, Jack encounters the three one by one. In chapter 15, the threesome try to stop Jack a final time in their mobile bathtub on top of the Mayor of Halloween Town's house. He defeats them yet they spring a trap and drop him into a maze in Oogie's lair. They do not appear again in the game afterwards.

In Kingdom Hearts, after hearing Jack speak of a heart that can control the Heartless, Oogie sends the three out to steal the heart as part of his plan to take over Halloween Town. After the three are defeated by Sora, Donald, and Goofy, they confess that Oogie made them do it. Later in the game, they comment how quiet Halloween Town has become without Oogie and consider making a ruckus just to liven things up. In Kingdom Hearts 358/2 Days, the three found a Heartless and kept it as their pet before it became too big for them to control.

In Kingdom Hearts II, Lock, Shock, and Barrel start off working as Doctor Finkelstein's assistants, until they encounter Maleficent, who revives Oogie Boogie for them and gives them the "Prison Keeper" Heartless to hold off Sora and company. The monster keeps the children in a cage underneath its body, but swallows one of them to act as its "pilot", each giving the monster a different ability and appearance, ultimately swallowing all three of them before attacking Sora and party with its full repertoire. After its defeat, the trio run off saying it was 'fun' and unintentionally reveal Oogie's return. In the second visit, the three are accused of stealing presents after they enter Santa's workshop and are caught looking through gifts. Sora and the party have to fight these mischievous rascals by knocking them unconscious and putting them in boxes. In the end, the three claim that they did not steal the presents as they regard Christmas toys to be boring while revealing that they were actually looking for parts for Doctor Finkelstein's Experiment, forcing Sora to let them free. They also cause mischief as obstacles in the "Making Presents" mini game, before and after the fight with the Experiment. After the battle, they run off and are not seen again in the game.

In the film, Lock was voiced by Paul Reubens, Shock was voiced by Catherine O'Hara, and Barrel was voiced by Danny Elfman. In the Kingdom Hearts series, Lock was voiced by Jess Harnell, Shock was voiced by Kath Soucie, and Barrel was voiced by Jeff Bennett. In The Nightmare Before Christmas: Oogie's Revenge, Paul Reubens reprised the role of Lock, Kath Soucie reprised the role of Shock from the "Kingdom Hearts" series, and Dee Bradley Baker voiced Barrel.

Santa Claus

Father Santa Claus the December Giver (or Sandy Claws as Jack calls him) is the leader of Christmas Town. When Jack stumbles upon the town, he becomes mesmerized with the holiday and tries to bring Christmas to Halloween Town. To do so, Jack orders Lock, Shock, and Barrel to kidnap Santa so Jack can take his place for the Christmas season. The three then take Santa to Oogie Boogie where the holiday figure's life is threatened. A last minute rescue helps save not only Santa, but the entire holiday of Christmas as well. Santa Claus manages to round up the living gifts and replace them with the right ones. Santa Claus is last seen flying over Halloween Town as snow starts to fall.

In The Nightmare Before Christmas: Oogie's Revenge, Oogie Boogie targets Santa Claus and leaves him hanging over the tracks for his scissor-tipped Oogie Train to drop him. Santa Claus was saved by Jack Skellington. When Oogie Boogie hijacked Santa's sleigh, Jack lets him use the same sleigh he used when Jack tried to improvise Christmas.

Santa Claus appears in Kingdom Hearts II. Sora, Donald Duck, and Goofy meet Santa Claus when they follow Jack Skellington to Christmas Town. He also made a reference about how Jack Skellington tried to improvise Christmas. Maleficent revives Oogie Boogie and sends him to capture Santa Claus. When Sora defeats Oogie Boogie, Santa Claus tells Jack that he should concentrate on Halloween and Santa should concentrate on Christmas. He also tells Sora to believe that he will meet Riku again. Later on, Santa's presents get stolen by Dr. Finkelstein's Experiment. He helps Jack make decoy presents to attract the Experiment. Jack and company get them back by hiding in a decoy present. After they defeat the Experiment, Santa Claus decides to give Jack a taste of what it's like to deliver Christmas presents. When Jack finishes delivering presents, Santa takes back his sleigh and brings forth beautiful snow drops as a present to those in Halloween Town.

Santa Claus is voiced by Ed Ivory in the movie and by Corey Burton in the video game spin-offs.

Zero
Zero is Jack's ghost dog who floats about freely and follows Jack wherever he goes. His nose, which is in the shape of a glowing orange jack-o-lantern, also doubles as a bright light.

In the Kingdom Hearts series, Zero is often called upon to search for someone. In The Nightmare Before Christmas: Oogie's Revenge, he will disappear and reappear depending on whether the player has completed the Halloween Town story.

Minor

Halloween Town residents
 Bats - There are bats seen all over throughout Halloween Town. The most notable ones are the ones seen appearing before Oogie Boogie's shadow on the moon, and the ones hanging on the Christmas Tree in the real world.
 Black cat - The black cat is a minor animal character from Halloween Town. They appeared during "This is Halloween" and "Sally's Song." There is a possibility that they might be Sally's pet.
 Behemoth (voiced by Randy Crenshaw) - A tall, somewhat fat zombie-like man with blue overalls, yellow gloves, and an axe stuck in his head. He looks rather dumb, but strong at the same time. He shouted at the Easter Bunny causing him to jump back into the bag. In The Nightmare Before Christmas: Oogie's Revenge, it was shown that Behemoth likes to grow pumpkins as mentioned by Mr. Hyde when Behemoth caught him near his pumpkins.
 Clown with the Tear-Away Face (voiced by Danny Elfman in the movie, Dee Bradley Baker in the video game spin-off.) A fat vile-looking clown who rides a unicycle and can tear off his face to reveal complete darkness and disappear into a puff of smoke. When his face is on, he speaks in a high voice. But when his face is off, he speaks in a deep, booming voice. The Clown also appears in Tim Burton's The Nightmare Before Christmas: Oogie's Revenge where Jack finds him the sewers upon his return. The Clown then unlocks the gate so that Jack could proceed to the graveyard. In the residential areas of Halloween Town, the Clown's unicycle was out of control causing Jack to use one of Dr. Finkelstein's inventions to stop the unicycle.
 Corpse Family - A family of zombies consisting of the Corpse Dad (voiced by Kerry Katz), Corpse Mom (voiced by Debi Durst), and Corpse Kid (voiced by Debi Durst). According to The Nightmare Before Christmas Trading Card Game, Corpse Dad is named "Ned," Corpse Mom is named "Bertha," and Corpse Kid is named "Ethan." Corpse Kid would often be seen in the company of Mummy Boy and Withered Winged Demon. Corpse Kid also appears in Tim Burton's The Nightmare Before Christmas: Oogie's Revenge where he would ask questions to Jack.
 Creature Under the Bed (voiced by Carmen Twilie) - A monster whose sharp teeth and glowing, red eyes are only shown. He is only seen once in the film with the line of "I am the one hiding under your bed, Teeth ground sharp and eyes glowing red!"
 Creature Under the Stairs (voiced by Kerry Katz) - A brownish-grey monster with a komodo dragon-like head, black and white stripes on his neck, with fingers resembling snakes, and spider-like hair noted by his line in “This is Halloween”; "I am the one hiding under your stairs, fingers like snakes and spiders in my hair!" During the Town Meeting, he, the Clown, and the Undersea Gal debate about what is in the present. He is later seen helping pass presents up a supply line in the song “Making Christmas.”
 Cyclops - A thin, black, pointy-eared monster with one eye. He looks rather nervous. His voice actor was never credited.
 Devil (voiced by Greg Proops) - A red devil complete with horns and a beard. He likes the idea of a Pox being in the box (Christmas present) as suggested by the Harlequin Demon during the town hall meeting song. The Devil is seen working the large saw on the bat toy with the Wolfman and the Corpse Dad during the "Making Christmas" song.
 Frankenstein - Frankenstein is seen in Halloween Town during the ending of "This is Halloween" clapping in the crowd in Town Square. He is never seen again through the rest of the film and is most likely just an Easter Egg character.
 Gate Keeper - The keeper of the Halloween Town Gate only seen a few times in the film. He is a short monster with a bird-like face, a yellow trench coat and a yellow bowler hat.
 Ghosts - A quintet of ghosts who provide a chorus role during musical numbers. According to The Nightmare Before Christmas Trading Card Game, their names are Alberto (a Bass), Pietro (a Baritone), Luciano (a Tenor), Sophia (an Alto), and Maria (a Soprano).
 Grim Reaper - A Grim Reaper was seen only twice in "This is Halloween" and at the town meeting. You never see his face and he also carries a scythe.
 Grim Reaper's Companion - A strange, pale skinned, dark-green eyed, dark yellow haired, black hooded old woman who sits beside the Reaper during the town meeting.
 Hanging Tree (voiced by Thurl Ravenscroft in the movie and Dee Bradley Baker in the video game spin-off) - A spirited tree. The Hanging Tree also appears in The Nightmare Before Christmas: Oogie's Revenge where Jack helps him find his skeletons after they got separated from him.
Hanging Skeletons - A bunch of skeletons hanging from the Hanging Tree's branches. They have one line in “This is Halloween.”
 Harlequin Demon (voiced by Greg Proops) - A monster with three moving fronds, sharp teeth, and a large strange mouth. During the Town Meeting, he has the thought of pox in the box (Christmas present). It attempts to make a hat out of dead rat during the song "Making Christmas". Though Jack voices his opinion and tells the Harlequin Demon to convert a dead bat into a hat. It is one of the more unique-looking and less-cliché (e.g. Werewolf, Devil) characters in the movie. 
 Igor (voiced by Joe Ranft in the film, Rob Paulsen in the video game sequel) - Dr. Finkelstein's assistant who enjoys dog bone treats. He is seen at the town meeting and is later seen giving Dr. Finkelstein the plans for the skeleton reindeer. In The Nightmare Before Christmas: Oogie's Revenge, Igor tells Jack Skellington of Dr. Finkelstein's strange behavior. Jack later helps Igor when his bone biscuit treats are stolen.
 Jack-o'-lantern - A pumpkin headed monster who can only be seen once at the town meeting.
 Jewel Finkelstein - A monster created by Dr. Finkelstein (also thought to be his wife) to replace Sally as his servant. Throughout the film, he is seen creating her and is finally seen at the end pushing his wheelchair during the finale part when the Halloween Town residents are enjoying the snow.
 Melting Man - A slimy man in a fancy suit who is always melting. He is seen in the song "Making Christmas" trying to pass off a dead turtle as a present as Jack suggests he try to find something pleasant. He is also very sticky, as seen when Jack's hand gets stuck on his head. In The Nightmare Before Christmas: The Pumpkin King, he was attacked by Oogie during the invitation where Oogie tore him to pieces. The three pieces were used as heads for some headless horsemen while the fourth piece the eyeball was left to roll on the ground. While the Mayor of Halloween Town was looking for ingredients for his lunch, Jack attacks and defeats the horsemen and gathers his piece thinking they were food but when they put them in the pot. The eyeball jumps in and the melting man reassembled himself. He then reveals that Oogie Boogie is behind the bug invasion. To thank Jack, he helps in pulling himself together and he gives him the gum shoes so he can climb up to high places.
 Mr. Hyde (voiced by Randy Crenshaw) - A man with little versions of himself in his top hat. They also appear in The Nightmare Before Christmas: Oogie's Revenge where they travel with Jack to serve as the Save Points of the game and give facts about the area they are in.
 Mummy Boy (voiced by Sherwood Ball) - A tiny mummy child with one visible yellow eyeball. He is seen in the company of the Corpse Kid or the Withered Winged Demon. The Mummy Boy is also on top of the Mayor's car helping him.
 Rats - Several rats can be seen running around Halloween Town. One rat is seen with a Christmas present and a party hat upon Santa Claus being brought into Halloween Town by Lock, Shock, and Barrel.
 Shadows - An assortment of shadows consisting of an odd ghostly demon shadow, a werewolf shadow, and a female two-headed twin shadow who introduce the song "This Is Halloween." The demon and wolf shadows have exactly the same voice.
 Skeletal Reindeer - The Skeletal Reindeer were created by Doctor Finkelstein in the movie to act as the reindeer that will pull the sleigh that Jack will pilot. They were broken when the air force shot down Jack's sleigh. In The Nightmare Before Christmas: Oogie's Revenge, the Skeletal Reindeer were rebuilt when the sleigh arrives for Santa Claus to use after Oogie Boogie had hijacked Santa's sleigh.
 Skeletal Rooster - A Skeletal Rooster is seen crowing at the crack of dawn before the musical number "Jack's Obsession".
 Undersea Gal (voiced by Carmen Twillie) - The Undersea Gal is a cross between a gill-man and a mermaid. During the Town Meeting, she thought that the item in the present was the head that she found in the lake.
 Vampire Brothers (voiced by Randy Crenshaw, Kerry Katz, Glenn Walters, and Sherwood Ball) - Four vampires that have umbrellas when moving around in the day. They are all a different height and width. Two of them are tall and skinny, the other two are rather plump. The Vampire Brothers are also apparently of different ranks: Prince, Baron, Lord, and Count. The characters' last appearance in the movie features them playing ice hockey with a small jack-o'-lantern as a puck. In The Nightmare Before Christmas: The Pumpkin King, the Vampire Brothers are among the Halloween Town citizens driven out of town by the bug army. One of them is put into some kind trance by Lock, Shock, and Barrel, but is restored to normal after its death. They reward Jack the bat boomerang upgrade that Dr. Finkelstein asked him to deliver. The Vampire Brothers also appear in The Nightmare Before Christmas: Oogie's Revenge where Jack had to find the bat forms of the Vampire Brothers and return them to their coffins to change them back. After that was done, the Vampire Brothers stated to Jack Skellington that they opposed Oogie's plan stating that it wasn't the Halloween that Jack wanted which led to them getting trapped in their bat forms. The Vampire Brothers then give Jack the pieces of the key to the Mayor of Halloween Town's house.
 Witches - A tall witch (voiced by Susan McBride in the movie, Susanne Blakeslee in the video game) and a short witch (voiced by Debi Durst) are two of the  characters that sing in the song, “This is Halloween.” While their names aren't given in the movie, the Nightmare Before Christmas trading card game gives them the names "Helgamine" (the tall witch) and "Zeldaborne" (the short witch) They also appear in The Nightmare Before Christmas: Oogie's Revenge where they have a shop near the town hall.
 Withered Winged Demon (voiced by Susan McBride) - A small demon that uses his large, torn, and withered wings to walk. He is often seen in the company of the Corpse Kid and the Mummy Boy.
 Werewolf (voiced by Glenn Walters) - A black furred werewolf that lives in Halloween Town. In the "Making Christmas" number, he was seen working with the Corpse Dad and the Devil on a bat toy.
 Zombie Band - A zombie band that consists of an Accordion player (voiced by L. Peter Callender), a bass player, and a saxophone player (voiced by Greg Proops). According to The Nightmare Before Christmas Trading Card Game, the Accordion player is named "Jimmy", the bass player is named "Jim", and the Sax Player is named "James". Jim's bass contains a speaking severed head somewhat resembling that of Danny Elfman.

Halloween Town-based Toys
The following toys were created by the citizens of Halloween Town:

 Giant Snake - A large ravenous orange python with black stripes and large mouth. It almost eats the Corpse Dad. Later, Jack delivers it to a house as a gift where it eats a Christmas tree, much to a child's horror, until Santa makes him cough out the tree and a gift as well. It is also unknown what the real gift was for the little boy.
 Jack-in-the-box - A pumpkin-headed jack-in-the-box and a black cat jack-in-the-box were seen being created by the Clown with the Tear Away Face. They both have a crazy clown face on the front of their boxes. The pumpkin-headed one was given to a rather plump kid who was first seen running down a hall in terror as it does an evil laugh. The kid is next seen on a shelf while the jack-in-the-box jumps up and down until Santa rescues him and takes the jack-in-the-box away. The portly kid's real present is a candy cane. It is unknown who Jack gave the black cat jack to. 
 Man-Eating Wreath - One of the Christmas gifts. Jack gives it to an old lady during his Christmas Eve run. It extends vines out from underneath it and dangles them above the lady to frighten her. It is implied that Santa later took it away.
 Vampire Teddy - A vampire-like teddy bear with a big open mouth grin and Mickey Mouse-like ears that Jack gives on Christmas. It flies and chases a little boy and a little girl until the real Santa Claus returns and takes away the teddy and replaces it with a normal teddy bear. In The Nightmare Before Christmas: Oogie's Revenge, the Scary Teddy appears as a common enemy called "Trick" alongside another enemy named "Treat" (a Jack-o'-lantern, thus creating a nod to "trick-or-treat") where their vocal effects are provided by Dee Bradley Baker.
 Shrunken head - A shrunken head that Jack Skellington as Santa Claus gave to a boy which caused the boy's parents to scream and faint. Santa Claus returned and replaced the shrunken head with a puppy. The boy, referred to as "Santa boy," was voiced by John Morris.
 Evil Toy Duck (voiced by Greg Proops) - A yellow evil-looking toy duck that has a minor part in the song "Making Christmas" being built and painted by the Vampire Brothers. It later chased after some kids until Santa Claus returns and takes it away, replacing it with a toy sailboat.

Christmas Town residents
 Christmas Elves - Santa Claus's helpers who are responsible for preparing the gifts and decorations for Christmas.
 Mrs. Claus - Santa Claus's wife, she is seen in the background as he checks the naughty-nice list.
 Penguins - Several penguins can be seen.
 Santa Claus' reindeer - Santa Claus' reindeer fly with magic and pull Santa's sleigh.

Enemies
 Colossal Moth - A huge moth that has super acidic saliva and exhales poisonous fumes. Featured in The Nightmare Before Christmas: The Pumpkin King.  
 Giant Snake - An artificial bug-filled snake who is a boss in The Nightmare Before Christmas: The Pumpkin King.
 Halloween Ghosts - The Halloween Ghosts appear in The Nightmare Before Christmas: Oogie's Revenge having been created by Dr. Finkelstein at the time when Oogie Boogie tricked citizens of Halloween Town. The Halloween Ghosts are much different from the ghosts that appear in the movie as they are very fast and great at dodging. Tricking them to come near Jack and sending them into the ground is an easy way to defeat them. They are seen in "Jack's Return" in the Oogie Boogie Shadow battle.
 King Ghosts - They are stronger than the Halloween Ghosts, but require the same tactics to defeat them.
 Mega Spider - A Mega Spider is fought three times in The Nightmare Before Christmas: Oogie's Revenge. It will shoot cobwebs at Jack and even charge. Its weak spot is the pumpkin shape on its abdomen. If successfully attacked there, it will go underground and launch Baby Spiders at Jack. Another type of Mega Spider appears in The Nightmare Before Christmas: The Pumpkin King as the mutated pet of Lock, Shock, and Barrel.
 Mother Locust - A locust with an abdomen filled with swollen eggs who is a boss in The Nightmare Before Christmas: The Pumpkin King.
 Oogie Cycle - A colossal beetle that serves as Oogie's ride and the final boss in The Nightmare Before Christmas: The Pumpkin King. It acts as a motorcycle-like mode of transportation for Oogie, Lock, Shock, and Barrel.
 Oogie Train - A scissor-tipped train who is a boss in The Nightmare Before Christmas: Oogie's Revenge. Fought in "Saving Sandy," Jack had to always change the train tracks to keep this scissor-tipped train from going on the track leading to the rope that is holding Santa Claus up. Keep attacking the Oogie-Train while evading skeletons disguised as snowmen.
 Enormous Rolly Polly - A large but somewhat weak pillbug who is a boss in The Nightmare Before Christmas: The Pumpkin King.
 Rolly Polly - A large offspring of Enormous Rolly Polly. Featured in The Nightmare Before Christmas: The Pumpkin King.
 Skeletons - In The Nightmare Before Christmas: Oogie's Revenge, Oogie Boogie had a bunch of skeletons that served him which were brought to life by Dr. Finkelstein at the time when Oogie Boogie tricked the citizens of Halloween Town. They resemble the Skeletons in Oogie Boogie's lair.
 Blue Skeletons - The Blue Skeletons are the easiest to defeat. They are slow and have short reaches unless they are mad and spinning.
 Heat Skeletons - The Heat Skeletons are the most annoying of the enemies Jack fights. They have short reaches, but they can throw boomerangs.
 Orc Skeletons - They are like the Blue Skeletons except the mad ones wield clubs. Just like the Blue Skeletons, they are slow and have short reaches unless they are mad and spinning.
 Troll Skeletons - The Troll Skeletons are big and wield big clubs. They can only be grabbed when the Soul Robber is Level 3. If they drop their clubs, use the Soul Robber to throw the clubs at them.
 King Skeletons - The King Skeletons are also big and wield big axes. The attack on the King Skeletons are the same as Troll Skeletons, with two exceptions. They cannot be grabbed at all, only turned around. They can be only hit while they are growling, or from behind.
 Fire and Ice King Skeletons - Two bosses from The Nightmare Before Christmas: Oogie's Revenge. Fought in "Fire and Ice Frenzy," these two big skeletons appear to fight Jack after he replaced the Oogie-Doors with the real Holiday Doors. Use the Santa Jack costume to fight the Fire King Skeleton and the Pumpkin King costume to fight the Ice King Skeleton.
 Zombie Centipede - A huge centipede with wings that was brought back from the dead by Oogie. Featured The Nightmare Before Christmas: The Pumpkin King.

Marketing
The owners of the franchise have undertaken an extensive marketing campaign of these characters across many media. In addition to the "Haunted Mansion Holiday at Disneyland" featuring "Tim Burton's The Nightmare Before Christmas characters," Jack Skellington, Sally, Pajama Jack, and the mayor have been made into Bendies figures, while Jack and Sally even appear in fine art. Moreover, Sally has been made into an action figure and a Halloween costume. The Mayor has been made into a Bendies figure. Jack is also the titular character in the short story "Tim Burton's The Nightmare Before Christmas: Jack's story."

Jim Edwards actually contends that "Tim Burton's animated movie The Nightmare Before Christmas is really a movie about the marketing business. The movie's lead character, Jack Skellington, the chief marketing officer (CMO) for a successful company decides that his success is boring and he wants the company to have a different business plan. Some have wondered which real-life company failure the movie is based on: Sergio Zyman's New Coke or Merck's launch and subsequent withdrawal of Vioxx."

Reception
While Yvonne Tasker notes "the complex characterization seen in The Nightmare Before Christmas," Michael A. Morrison discusses the influence of Dr. Seuss's How the Grinch Stole Christmas on the film, writing that Jack parallels the Grinch and Zero parallels Max, the Grinch's dog. Philip Nel writes that the film "challenges the wisdom of adults through its trickster characters" contrasting Jack as a "good trickster" with Oogie Boogie, whom he also compares with Dr. Seuss's Dr. Terwilliker, as a bad trickster. Richard Delgado and Jean Stefancic see the characters as presented in a more negative light and criticise the film's characters as having racial constructs, with the protagonists using "whitespeak" and the antagonist, Oogie Boogie, using "blackspeak."

This perception was not entirely unanticipated by the filmmakers. Danny Elfman was worried the characterization of Oogie Boogie would be considered racist by the National Association for the Advancement of Colored People (NAACP). As Delgado and Stefancic's book reveals, Elfman's predictions became true. Nevertheless, director Henry Selick stated the character was inspired from the Betty Boop cartoon The Old Man of the Mountain. "Cab Calloway would dance his inimitable jazz dance and sing "Minnie the Moocher" or "Old Man of the Mountain", and they would rotoscope him, trace him, turn him into a cartoon character, often transforming him into an animal, like a walrus," Selick continued. "I think those are some of the most inventive moments in cartoon history, in no way racist, even though he was sometimes a villain. We went with Ken Page, who is a black singer and he had no problem with it".

References

External links
 "Full cast and crew for The Nightmare Before Christmas (1993)," The Internet Movie Database
 "Full cast and crew for The Nightmare Before Christmas: Oogie's Revenge (2004) (VG)," The Internet Movie Database

Characters
Lists of Disney animated film characters
Disney characters originating in film
Disney animated characters